The 2016 TEAN International was a professional tennis tournament played on outdoor clay courts. It was the 21st edition of the tournament which was part of the 2016 ATP Challenger Tour and the 16th edition of the tournament for the 2016 ITF Women's Circuit. It took place in Alphen aan den Rijn, Netherlands, on 6 – 11 September 2016.

ATP singles main draw entrants

Seeds

 1 Rankings are as of August 29, 2016.

Other entrants
The following players received wildcards into the singles main draw: 
  Jelle Sels
  Botic van de Zandschulp
  Jesse Huta Galung
  Tallon Griekspoor

The following player received entry into the singles main draw with a protected ranking:
  Boy Westerhof

The following player received entry as an alternate:
  Dragoș Dima

The following players received entry from the qualifying draw:
  Maxime Chazal
  Oscar Otte
  Andriej Kapaś
  Cedrik-Marcel Stebe

The following player received entry as a lucky loser:
  Lukas Mugevičius

WTA singles main draw entrants

Seeds

 1 Rankings are as of August 29, 2016.

Other entrants 
The following players received wildcards into the singles main draw:
  Dainah Cameron
  Dewi Dijkman
  Nina Kruijer
  Suzan Lamens

The following players received entry from the qualifying draw:
  Jacqueline Böpple
  Liv Geurts
  Donnaroza Gouvernante
  Liza Lebedzeva
  Noa Liauw a Fong
  Diana Popescu
  Kelly Versteeg
  Claire Verwerda

The following player received entry as a lucky loser:
  Anna Mária Kalavská

Champions

Men's singles 

  Jan-Lennard Struff def.  Robin Haase, 6–4, 6–1

Women's singles 
 Chayenne Ewijk def.  Suzan Lamens, 7–5, 7–5

Men's doubles 

  Daniel Masur /  Jan-Lennard Struff def.  Robin Haase /  Boy Westerhof, 6–4, 6–1

Women's doubles 
  Nina Kruijer /  Suzan Lamens def.  Chayenne Ewijk /  Rosalie van der Hoek, 6–0, 3–6, [10–5]

References

External links 
 Official website

2016
2016 ATP Challenger Tour
2016 ITF Women's Circuit
2016 in Dutch tennis